is a Japanese manga series written and illustrated by Aiko Nobara, serialized in Fusion Product's Baby since 2009. The series has been reprinted by Tokyo Mangasha and it has been collected in three tankōbon volumes as of January 2019. A series of two Drama CDs have also been released.

Plot
When freshman high school student Daisuke Shiba confesses to his delinquent upperclassman Yūji Akiyama in front of all of Akiyama's friends, getting beat up and ridiculed would maybe be understandable. But the events that follow are nowhere near what any of them would expect, as Shiba ends up starting a relationship with Akiyama.

Characters

A freshman high school student. Shiba fell in love with Akiyama at first sight, after being rescued by him from some bullies at the beginning of the school year. Sweet and kind, he is willing to do anything for Akiyama. He also has a part-time job in a convenience store.

Shiba's upperclassman, a second year student. Akiyama has a reputation of being a juvenile delinquent, but actually he is a calm, friendly and somewhat melancholic boy. He lives alone in a big house and it's hinted that his strained father is the only family he has. 

Akiyama's friend since middle school. He hates being called by his first name since he considers it a girly name. However, Akiyama is the only one who can call him that way.

Akiyama's friend. He works in a restaurant.

Another of Akiyama's friends.

Shiba's co-worker, a sweet and nice girl.

Media

Manga
The series started its serialization on September 24, 2009. It is published by Tokyo Mangasha. The first volume was released on 2011 and as of January, 2019 three volumes have been released in Japan.

Drama CDs 
A series of two Drama CDs have been released. The first one was launched on September 30, 2012, while the second one on February 22, 2019. The Japanese voice acting cast includes; Yoshitsugu Matsuoka, Kazuyuki Okitsu, Toshiki Masuda, and Yūsuke Shirai.

References

Yaoi anime and manga
Romance anime and manga
Slice of life anime and manga
Shōjo manga
Fusion Product manga
Tokyo Mangasha manga